Icon is a greatest hits album by Cher, released in 2011 by Geffen Records. It is part of the Icon album series by Universal Music Enterprises.

Track listing

Charts

Certifications and sales

References

2011 greatest hits albums
Cher compilation albums